Sheridan Township may refer to:

Illinois

 Sheridan Township, Logan County, Illinois

Iowa

 Sheridan Township, Carroll County, Iowa
 Sheridan Township, Cherokee County, Iowa
 Sheridan Township, Poweshiek County, Iowa
 Sheridan Township, Scott County, Iowa
 Sheridan Township, Sioux County, Iowa, in Sioux County, Iowa

Kansas

 Sheridan Township, Cherokee County, Kansas
 Sheridan Township, Cowley County, Kansas
 Sheridan Township, Crawford County, Kansas
 Sheridan Township, Linn County, Kansas, in Linn County, Kansas
 Sheridan Township, Ottawa County, Kansas, in Ottawa County, Kansas
 Sheridan Township, Sheridan County, Kansas
 Sheridan Township, Washington County, Kansas, in Washington County, Kansas

Michigan

 Sheridan Township, Mecosta County, Michigan
 Sheridan Township, Mason County, Michigan
 Sheridan Township, Huron County, Michigan
 Sheridan Township, Clare County, Michigan
 Sheridan Township, Calhoun County, Michigan
 Sheridan Charter Township, Michigan

Minnesota

 Sheridan Township, Redwood County, Minnesota

Missouri

 Sheridan Township, Dallas County, Missouri
 Sheridan Township, Daviess County, Missouri
 Sheridan Township, Jasper County, Missouri

Nebraska

 Sheridan Township, Clay County, Nebraska
 Sheridan Township, Holt County, Nebraska
 Sheridan Township, Phelps County, Nebraska

North Dakota

 Sheridan Township, LaMoure County, North Dakota, in LaMoure County, North Dakota

Oklahoma

 Sheridan Township, Garfield County, Oklahoma
 Sheridan Township, Major County, Oklahoma

South Dakota

 Sheridan Township, Codington County, South Dakota, in Codington County, South Dakota

See also

Sheridan (disambiguation)

Township name disambiguation pages